Barrier Reef was an Australian television series that was first screened domestically in 1971. However, 19 episodes had already premiered on British television on BBC1 between 5 October 1970 and 15 February 1971 and four more aired between 5 April and 3 May 1971 in advance of Australian broadcast.

Barrier Reef was about a group of marine biologists on board a sailing ship called the New Endeavour, researching around the Great Barrier Reef, off Queensland, Australia. "It was the first series in the world to feature extensive colour underwater filming on location". The show was almost entirely filmed in North Queensland and at the time the show was reported to be the most expensive series ever produced in Australia and one of the few Australian series to be produced outside Sydney or Melbourne. Barrier Reef was produced by Fauna Productions who also created the uniquely Australian hit TV series Skippy the Bush Kangaroo, using some of the same crew and cast members. Like the Skippy series, Barrier Reef showcased iconic Australian locations in colour film and was destined for an international audience. The show was screened in many countries across the world, giving international audiences a glimpse of what the stereotypical Australia was like.

Reception
In contrast to TV shows like Riptide or The Outsiders this series was made in Australia, using Australian scripts, featuring Australian leading actors, and covering scientific topics that were uncommon on TV. It was broadcast by BBC, in the US by NBC, and also by TV stations in Canada, Japan, South America, South Africa and numerous European countries. The series had 39 episodes and was re-run in various markets for many years.

See also
 Ron Taylor
 Valerie Taylor

External links
Memorable TV

Barrier Reef at AustLit
Who remembers the 1970s TV show 'Barrier Reef'?

References

Network 10 original programming
1971 Australian television series debuts
1972 Australian television series endings
English-language television shows
Submarines in fiction
1970s Australian drama television series